Verkh-Allak is a rural locality (a selo) and the administrative center of Verkh-Allaksky Selsoviet, Kamensky District, Altai Krai, Russia. The population was 483 as of 2013. There are 11 streets.

Geography 
Verkh-Allak is located on the Priobskoye plato, 27 km northeast of Kamen-na-Obi (the district's administrative centre) by road. 3 Internatsional is the nearest rural locality.

References 

Rural localities in Kamensky District, Altai Krai